Haunted Trails is a 1949 American Western film directed by Lambert Hillyer and written by Adele Buffington. The film stars Whip Wilson, Andy Clyde, Reno Browne, Dennis Moore, I. Stanford Jolley and William Ruhl. The film was released on August 21, 1949, by Monogram Pictures.

Plot

Cast          
Whip Wilson as Whip Wilson 
Andy Clyde as Winks
Reno Browne as Marie Martel
Dennis Moore as Phil Rankin
I. Stanford Jolley as Joe Rankin
William Ruhl as Gorman 
John Merton as Sheriff Charlie Coombs
Mary Gordon as Aunt Libby
Steve Clark as Lew
Myron Healey as Lassiter
Milburn Morante as Cookie
Eddie Majors as Jed
Bud Osborne as Tom Craig
Ted Adams as Thompson

References

External links
 

1949 films
American Western (genre) films
1949 Western (genre) films
Monogram Pictures films
Films directed by Lambert Hillyer
American black-and-white films
1940s English-language films
1940s American films